Jamshed Ahmed (born 10 December 1988) is a Pakistani left-arm swing bowler. As well as playing first-class cricket, he was part of the pace attack that lead Pakistan to the 2006 U-19 Cricket World Cup in Sri Lanka.

References

1988 births
Pakistani cricketers
Living people
Lahore Eagles cricketers
Pakistan International Airlines cricketers
Cricketers from Lahore